Sibusiso Hlubi (born 2 October 1994) is a South African soccer player who last played as a midfielder for South African Premier Division side Sekhukhune United.

References

1994 births
Living people
South African soccer players
Association football midfielders
Mthatha Bucks F.C. players
Cape Town All Stars players
Free State Stars F.C. players
Polokwane City F.C. players
Maritzburg United F.C. players
Sekhukhune United F.C. players
South African Premier Division players
National First Division players